The  is an archaeological site with a Yayoi period settlement, located in the Aoya neighborhood of the city of Tottori in the San'in region of Japan. The site was designated a National Historic Site in 2008.

Overview
The Aoyakamiji site was discovered along with the construction of the Aoya-Hago Road and the Tottori Prefectural Road No. 274 Aoya Station Ide Line. Archaeological excavations since 1998 have revealed that the residential area was about 200 meters in diameter, and that paddy fields extended on the south and west sides for over 700 meters on the long side to about 300 meters on the short side, for a total of total of approximately 55,000 square meters. The settlement area began in the latter half of the early Yayoi period, expanded significantly in the latter half of the middle Yayoi period, continued to the latter period, and suddenly disappeared at the beginning of the early Kofun period. The overlapping foundations of numerous pillar-supported buildings and underground storage pits were found. However, the most unusual feature is a revetment facility made of massive cedar planks from the middle and latter half of the Yayoi period that extends across the southeastern part of the ruins. It was made from huge boards with a length of 260 cm and a width of 70 cm arranged side by side and fixed with stakes. In the later period, a ditch was built to surround the high range of the terrain, and rows of sheet piles were driven in many layers here. Some of these revetment facilities include planks that appear to have been converted from building materials. The site also yielded a very large number of artifacts. In addition to finished and unfinished woodware, bone and horn tools, animal bones, and metalware such as ironware and bronze ware, more than 5,300 human remains were also unearthed. DNA testing on four of these remains revealed that two of the remains had Haplogroup C-M8 markers, which are more commonly found among the Jōmon period.  Among the late Yayoi period bones found in a ditch on the east side of the site, 110 had wound marks. In addition, two bones are found to have lesions caused by vertebral caries, making these the oldest known tuberculosis case in Japan. Three skulls were found to contain organic materials that are the remnants of brain material.  Another important find was a 120-cm fragment of a wooden shield made from momi fir, which had been painted green. This is the earliest known use of green pigment in East Asia. As many as 35 coprolites were unearthed, which also provides  important knowledge for restoring the lives of people in the Yayoi period. Many of the relics indicate a relationship with the Asian continent, hinting at trade and cultural exchange during the Yayoi period across then Sea of Japan.

The site is open to the public, but the ruins have been backfilled. The excavated items are stored and exhibited at the Yayoi Museum Aoya Kamiterachi Ruins Exhibition Hall located ten minutes on foot from Aoya Station on the JR West San'in Main Line. These artifacts were collective designated an Important Cultural Property in 2019.

See also

List of Historic Sites of Japan (Tottori)

References

External links
 Official site 
Yayoi Museum Aoya Kamiterachi Ruins Exhibition Hall official site 
Tottor prefecture official site 

Yayoi period
History of Tottori Prefecture
Tottori (city)
Historic Sites of Japan